Francesco Ruschi was an Italian painter born in Rome around 1610. He studied in Rome under Giuseppe Cesari (Cavalier d'Arpino), Francesco Albani and Pietro da Cortona.
His work also shows the influence of Caravaggio.
He settled in Venice before 1629. He became a friend of the writer Giovan Francesco Loredan, for whom he drew the cover pages of several works.
He moved to Treviso from 1656, and died there in 1661.

Work
Ruschi was influenced by the paintings of Paolo Veronese in his academic and decorative interpretations. These include Madonna and saints (1641) San Pietro di Castello, Venice; Madonna and saints (c. 1656) San Clemente, Venice; Repudiation of Hagar, Treviso Civic Museum; Saint Ursula, Metropolitan Museum.

References
Citations

Sources

1610 births
1661 deaths
17th-century Italian painters
Italian male painters
Italian Baroque painters